Ferrari is an Italian occupational surname, the plural form of Ferraro, meaning blacksmith.

People with the surname
 Amato Ferrari (born 1966), founder of Italian racing team AF Corse
 Alex Ferrari (footballer) (born 1994), Italian footballer
 Alex Ferrari (singer) (born 1982), Brazilian singer
 Andrea Carlo Ferrari (1850–1921), Catholic Cardinal
 Alfredo Baldomir Ferrari (1884–1948), Uruguayan politician
 Alfredo Ferrari (1932–1956), known as Dino, automotive engineer and son of Enzo Ferrari
 Belinda Ferrari, Australian microbiologist
 Benedetto Ferrari (c. 1603–1681), Italian composer
 Davide Ferrari (born 1992) Italian footballer
 Defendente Ferrari (c. 1480 – c. 1540), Italian painter
 Dino Ferrari (1914–2000), Italian painter
 Domenico Ferrari (1722–1780), Italian violinist and composer
 Enzo Ferrari (1898–1988), founder of Italian automaker Ferrari S.p.A.
 Enzo Ferrari (footballer) (born 1942), Italian footballer and manager
 Ermanno Wolf-Ferrari (1876–1948), Italian-German composer
 Ettore Ferrari (1848–1929), Italian sculptor
 Fausto Ferrari (born 1980), Italian footballer
 Franck Ferrari (1963–2015), French baritone
 Franco Ferrari (disambiguation), several people
 Gian Marco Ferrari, Italian footballer
 Giacomo Ferrari, multiple people
 Giovanni Ferrari (1907–1982), Italian footballer and coach
 Giovanni Baptista Ferrari (1584–1655), Italian Jesuit and botanist
 Isabella Ferrari (born 1964), Italian actress
 Jérémy Ferrari (born 1985), French comedian
 Johann Angelo Ferrari (1806–1876), Italian-Austrian entomologist
 Larry Ferrari (1932–1997), American organist
 Lodovico Ferrari (1522–1565), Italian mathematician
 Lolo Ferrari, (1963–2000), French dancer, pornographic actress, actress and singer
 Luc Ferrari (1929–2005), French-born Italian composer
 Marina Ferrari (born 1973), French politician
 Matteo Ferrari (born 1979), Italian footballer
 Max Ferrari (politician) (born 1971), Italian politician and journalist
 Max Ferrari (soccer) (born 2000), Canadian soccer player
 Michel Ferrari (born 1954), Swiss neurologist
 Michele Ferrari (born 1953), Italian physician, cycling coach and author
 Michelle Ferrari (born 1983), Italian pornographic actress and television personality
 Nick Ferrari (born 1959), British broadcaster
 Paola Ferrari (basketball) (born 1985), Paraguayan basketball player
 Paola Ferrari (journalist) (born 1960), Italian journalist
 Paulo Ferrari (born 1982), Argentine footballer
 Paul Ferreri (1948–2017), Italian/Australian boxer
 Philipp von Ferrary (1850–1917), sometimes spelt Ferrari, philatelist who assembled one of the most complete stamp collections ever
 Roberto Ferrari (disambiguation), several people
 Roberto Ferrari (gymnast) (1890–1954), Italian gymnast
 Roberto Ferrari (athlete) (born 1967), Italian high jumper
 Roberto Ferrari (fencer) (born 1923), Italian Olympic fencer
 Roberto Ferrari (cyclist) (born 1983), Italian cyclist
 Vanessa Ferrari (born 1990), Italian gymnast

See also 
 
 Ferrari (disambiguation)
 Ferraris (surname)
 Ferrara
 Ferrero

References 

Italian-language surnames
Occupational surnames
Surnames of South Tyrolean origin